The 1939–40 Toronto Maple Leafs season was Toronto's 23rd season of operation in the National Hockey League (NHL). The Maple Leafs again advanced to the Stanley Cup Final, losing to the New York Rangers.

Offseason

Regular season

Final standings

Record vs. opponents

Schedule and results

Playoffs
The Maple Leafs played the Chicago Black Hawks and Detroit Red Wings in the first two rounds of the playoffs in best of three series, and swept both.  In the finals, they played the New York Rangers in a best of seven series and lost 4–2.

Player statistics

Regular season
Scoring

Goaltending

Playoffs
Scoring

Goaltending

Awards and records

Transactions
May 18, 1939: Acquired Sweeney Schriner from the New York Americans for Murray Armstrong, Buzz Boll, Busher Jackson and Doc Romnes
July 1, 1939: Charlie Conacher returned from the Detroit Red Wings after Detroit failed to renew contract
September 1, 1939: Signed Free Agent Clarence Drouillard
September 22, 1939: Traded Charlie Conacher to the New York Americans for Future Considerations
October 13, 1939: Traded Chuck Shannon to the New York Americans for cash
October 13, 1939: Traded Jack Howard to the St. Louis Flyers of the AHA for cash

See also
1939–40 NHL season

References

External links
 

Toronto Maple Leafs seasons
Toronto
Toronto